Kibworth  is an area of the Harborough district of Leicestershire, England, that contains two civil parishes: the villages of Kibworth Beauchamp  and Kibworth Harcourt . At the 2011 census, Kibworth Beauchamp had a population of 5,433 and Kibworth Harcourt 990. The villages are divided by the Midland Main Line. Kibworth is close to Foxton Locks, Market Harborough, and Leicester.

History

In 1270 Walter de Merton, the founder of Merton College, Oxford, bought a large part of the parish of Kibworth Harcourt from Saer de Harcourt, who had been forced to sell the estate after giving his support to the unsuccessful "Second Barons' War" led by Simon de Montfort. Much of the parish has remained the property of Merton College, Oxford to the present day. There is a stained-glass window depicting Walter de Merton in the bell tower of the parish church, St Wilfrid's, of which the warden and scholars of the college are joint patrons with the Bishop of Leicester. The church is a Grade II* listed building.

A village school was founded in 1709, and endowed by Sir Nathaniel Edwards. 

Kibworth Harcourt was the birthplace of the writer/reformer Anna Laetitia Barbauld (1743–1825) and her brother John Aikin. Their father, John Aikin (1713–1780), kept a dissenting academy there and served as minister of a nearby Presbyterian chapel. The family moved in 1757 to Warrington.

On 23 July 1825 the ancient tower and spire of St Wilfrid's collapsed.

Michael Wood's Story of England
In September 2010, Kibworth was the central feature of Michael Wood's Story of England, a documentary aired on both BBC Four, BBC Two, and repeated on the UKTV channel Yesterday, and PBS America, presented by Michael Wood about the history of England framed through Kibworth.

A book of the same name was published by Viking. The series was likened to Who Do You Think You Are? for a whole community. Villagers (Kibworth Improvement Team - KiT) have created a new website and successfully requested a grant of £48,200 from the Heritage Lottery Fund to continue the legacy of the TV series by creating a Kibworth Guide Booklet (heritage trails for Kibworth Harcourt, Kibworth Beauchamp and Smeeton Westerby), several interpretation panels around the three villages, ongoing study materials for the three tiers of local schools, and an Archive (Virtual Museum).

Facilities
Kibworth has a number of shops, a community newspaper (The Kibworth & District Chronicle), and since 2002 new shops, including a branch of the Co-Op. New housing continues to be built on the edge of the village, causing periodic controversy.

The Bookshop, which opened in the High Street in 2009, won a regional award for Independent Bookseller of The Year in 2012.

Transport
Arriva Midlands operates Sapphire route X3 between Leicester and Market Harborough and Stagecoach Midlands route X7 between Leicester and Northampton, both via the village. The Midland Main Line runs through the area, but Kibworth railway station, which served both villages, closed in 1968.

Sports
The local cricket club won the ECB National Club Cricket Championship in 2004.

The association football club, previously Kibworth and Smeeton, was renamed in 2018 as Kibworth Town, merging the younger and senior teams together. The village also has clubs for snooker, tennis, golf, bowls and dance.

Kibworth is also home to Kibworth Rugby Stars, a children's rugby club serving ages 18 months to 6 years.

Kibworth Harcourt Mill
The mill, a Grade 2* listed structure, last worked in the 1930s and until 1936 was owned by Merton College, Oxford, then ownership and responsibility was transferred to the Society for the Protection of Ancient Buildings (SPAB). As of March 2022, restoration costing £350,000 is close to completion. With parts dating from "at least 1711", it is the last surviving post mill in Leicestershire county.

Notable residents
In birth order:
John Aikin (1713–1780), Unitarian preacher, schoolteacher and father of Anna Laetitia Barbauld, lived and taught in Kibworth in 1730–58.
Anna Laetitia Barbauld (née Aikin, 1743–1823), poet, essayist, children's author and daughter of John Aikin, was born in Kibworth Harcourt.
John Aikin (1747–1822), physician, biographer and brother of Anna Laetitia Barbauld, was born in Kibworth Harcourt.
James Beresford (1764–1840), Anglican cleric and humorist, was rector of Kibworth from 1812 until his death in 1840.
Colonel John Worthy Chaplin (1840–1920), awarded the Victoria Cross for gallantry in 1860 in the Second China War, was buried in Kibworth New Cemetery.
Edmund Knox (1847–1937), Anglican bishop, Evangelical writer and father of Ronald Knox, was rector of Kibworth in 1884–1891.
Samuel Perkins Pick (1858–1919), architect, was educated at Kibworth Grammar School.
T. E. R. Phillips (1868–1942), Anglican cleric and astronomer specializing in planets, was born in Kibworth.
Wilfred Knox (1886–1950), Anglican theologian and brother of Ronald Knox, was born in Kibworth.
Ronald Knox (1888–1957), Roman Catholic monsignor and religious writer, was born in Kibworth.
Sir Nicholas Harold Lloyd Ridley (1906–2001), inventor of the Intraocular lens, was born in Kibworth.
Stu Williamson (born 1956), photographer, inventor of the Tri-flector, and drummer for the Scottish group The Marmalade, is based in Kibworth.

References

External links

A History of Kibworth
Kibworth at genuki.org

Villages in Leicestershire
Harborough District